Tsukue (written: 机) is a Japanese surname. Notable people with the surname include:

, Japanese squash player
, Japanese squash player

Japanese-language surnames